Gutwein Ministry can refer to:
First Gutwein Ministry (2020–2021)
Second Gutwein Ministry (2021–present)